Agnes II (Agnes of Meissen; 1139 – 21 January 1203) was a member of the House of Wettin who reigned as Princess-Abbess of Quedlinburg.

Life
She was born in Meissen as the daughter of Conrad, Margrave of Meissen, and Luitgard of Swabia. In 1184, she was elected successor to Princess-Abbess Adelaide III.

Agnes was a significant patron of art, as well as miniaturist and engraver. During her reign, the nuns of Quedlinburg Abbey made large curtains that are indispensable in the study of the art industry of the era. She also wrote and illuminated books for divine service. However, her greatest masterpiece was the manufacture of wall-hangings, of which one set was intended to be sent to the Pope; this tapestry is the best preserved piece of Romanesque textile.

She died in Quedlinburg Abbey on 21 January 1203.

Legacy

Agnes is a featured figure on Judy Chicago's installation piece The Dinner Party, being represented as one of the 999 names on the Heritage Floor.

References

External links 
 
 Silver pfennig of Agnes II von Meissen, abbess of Quedlinburg in the collection of the British Museum.

|-

12th-century German abbesses
House of Wettin
Abbesses of Quedlinburg
1139 births
1203 deaths
German women artists
Medieval German women artists
12th-century women artists
13th-century women artists
12th-century German artists
13th-century German abbesses
13th-century German artists
Catholic painters
Catholic engravers
Female Catholic artists
Daughters of monarchs